The 2017–18 Ukrainian Premier League Reserves and Under 19 season are competitions between the reserves of Ukrainian Premier League Clubs and the Under 19s.

The events in the senior leagues during the 2016–17 season saw Dnipro Reserves and Volyn Lutsk Reserves be relegated with Veres RivneReserves and Mariupol Reserves entering the competition.

Teams

Under 21 competition

Standings

Top scorers

Under 19 competition

Standings

Top scorers

See also
 2017–18 Ukrainian Premier League

References

Reserves
Ukrainian Premier Reserve League seasons